Arthur Church may refer to:

 Arthur Herbert Church (1834–1915), British chemist
 Arthur Harry Church (1865–1937), British botanist
 Arthur Church, American billiards player